The 1986–87 season was Cardiff City F.C.'s 60th season in the Football League. They competed in the 24-team Division Four, then the fourth tier of English football, finishing fifteenth.

Players
First team squad.

League standings

Results by round

Fixtures and results

Fourth Division

Source

Littlewoods Cup

FA Cup

Welsh Cup

Freight Rover Trophy

See also
List of Cardiff City F.C. seasons

References

Bibliography

Welsh Football Data Archive

Cardiff City F.C. seasons
Cardiff City
Cardiff City